Tony Morgan may refer to:

 Tony Morgan (sailor) (born 1931), British sailor
 Tony Morgan (weightlifter) (born 1969), British weightlifter
 Tony Morgan (computer scientist) (born c. 1944), British computer scientist

See also  
 Anthony Morgan (disambiguation)